André Renato Antoniassi, usually known as André Zuba (born 23 June 1986) is a Brazilian football player at the position of goalkeeper.

André Zuba previously played for Santa Cruz in the Copa do Brasil.

References

1986 births
Living people
People from Mirassol
Brazilian footballers
Association football goalkeepers
Sociedade Esportiva Palmeiras players
Clube do Remo players
Santa Cruz Futebol Clube players
Botafogo Futebol Clube (PB) players
Sociedade Esportiva e Recreativa Caxias do Sul players
Guarany Sporting Club players
Fortaleza Esporte Clube players
Comercial Futebol Clube (Ribeirão Preto) players
Brazilian expatriate footballers
Expatriate footballers in Portugal
Brazilian expatriate sportspeople in Portugal
AD Oliveirense players
Mirassol Futebol Clube players
Rio Preto Esporte Clube players
Associação Desportiva Bahia de Feira players
Tupynambás Futebol Clube players
Estrela do Norte Futebol Clube players
Rio Branco Atlético Clube players
Footballers from São Paulo (state)